Jaathi Malli is a 1993 Indian Tamil-language film directed by K. Balachander starring Mukesh, Khushbu, Nassar, Vineeth and Yuvarani. The film was released on 14 January 1993, and won the Tamil Nadu State Film Award for Best Film.

Plot 
Sriranjini, a ghazal singer, visits a hill station to forget the murder of her mother who was very close to her. She meets Kesavan, who is a taxi driver. He shares his own pain regarding his father murdering his mother and siblings in a drunken rage. Horrified by this story, Sriranjini starts thinking less of her own loss. A situation arises that Sriranjini starts living in house as a paying guest and their relationship remains aloof in spite of mutual admiration.

They run into lovers Vineeth and Yuvarani who call themselves Moscow and Berlin. They are from different religions, Hinduism and Islam. It is not revealed as to who is Muslim and who is Hindu. They inform that they eloped as they wanted to defy their parents concept of marriage. The pesky lovers try to bring Sriranjini and Kesavan together. They also move into the house of Kesavan but are closer to Sriranjini who comes out of her depression regarding her mother's death.

Sriranjini later finds that Kesavan's story regarding his families fate is entirely fabricated and he hails from an affluent family. He confesses that he lied to make her understand that some people have bigger tragedies than what she saw in her life. He could not live with his family as they were having too many properties and inheritance fights and so, he decided to forfeit his inheritance entirely and lead a simple life as a taxi driver.

Later a rich North Indian man pays a lot of attention to Sriranjini and shows that he constantly listens to her music. Kesavan gets jealous of their constant chit chat in Hindi and regarding Ghazals and Sriranjini leaves the house after a fight. She finds that her patron almost keeps her in house arrest and expects her to be his mistress. Sriranjini wants to go back to Kesavan. The younger couple, Moscow and Berlin, try to help the older couple to get together.

When caught by the rioters, Moscow and Berlin ask the rioters to find their religion from their blood. The city is in strict curfew and they are injured in gunfire. They bring the older couple together before dying in each other's arms.

Cast 
Mukesh as Kesavan
Khushbu as Sriranjini
Vineeth as Moscow
Yuvarani as Berlin
Madhan Bob as Sathyam
Vichithra as Savitri, Sathyam's wife
Dhamu as Dhamu
Nassar as Director Pazhani Bhaskaran
 Rajesh Kumar as Reddy
H. Ramakrishnan as Dr. Sahasranamam
Delhi Ganesh as Vaidyanathan, Sahasranamam's brother
Kavithalaya Krishnan as compounder at Sahasranamam's clinic
Charle as Udhagai Murugan
K. S. Jayalakshmi as Aanandham, Sahasranamam's wife
 Yuvashree as Rani, nurse at Sahasranamam's clinic

Production 
Balachander approached T. Rajendar to portray a guest role in the film which he rejected. Khushbu's character was named Sriranjani, after the Carnatic raga of the same name. Part of the film's title serves as a double entendre; the full title refers to the jasmine flower, while jaathi also means caste.

Soundtrack 
The soundtrack was composed by Maragadha Mani. All lyrics were written by Vairamuthu.

Release and reception 
Jaathi Malli was released on 14 January 1993. Malini Mannath of The Indian Express called it "a total let down. The script just meanders with various subplots that gets linked whenever the director happens to remember each of them". C. R. K. of Kalki praised Balachander for making a film against caste riots but panned the cliched climax. Though the film was not a commercial success, it won the Tamil Nadu State Film Award for Best Film.

References

External links 
 

1990s Tamil-language films
1993 films
Films about singers
Films about terrorism in India
Films about the caste system in India
Films directed by K. Balachander
Films scored by M. M. Keeravani
Films with screenplays by K. Balachander